Roberta McRae  (born 6 September 1948 in Italy), former Australian politician, was a member of the unicameral Australian Capital Territory Legislative Assembly from 1992 to 1998, elected to the multi-member single constituency Assembly and later elected to represent the multi-member electorate of Ginninderra for the Labor Party. A former teacher, following politics, McRae entered academia.

Biography

Teaching career
In 1973 McRae travelled to Malaysia with Australian Volunteers Abroad and taught English as a second language at the Mara Institute of Technology. She returned to Australia in 1974, gained employment as public servant in the Department of Education and developed curriculum materials for the teaching of English as a second language (ESL) in Australian primary schools.

McRae worked as a speechwriter in the early days of the first ACT Administration, and in the Australian Public Service Commission where she managed a major review of the impact of Equal Employment Opportunity programs on people of non-English speaking backgrounds.

Political career
McRae was initially elected to the second ACT Legislative Assembly at the 1992 general election, and elected to represent Ginninderra in the Assembly in 1995 general election. McRae contested the 1998 ACT general election, however was unsuccessful in retaining her seat. During her term in the Assembly, McRae served as Speaker of the Australian Capital Territory Legislative Assembly, and was responsible for the successful  12 million project to create a permanent home of the Assembly.

Career after politics
McRae worked initially with the Education Network of Australia and then the Department of Health and Aged Care as a deputy director. McRae returned to study and by 2003 had completed a Graduate Diploma in Legal Practice at the Australian National University and graduated with a Bachelor of Laws from Macquarie University. She commenced employment as a lawyer specialising in residential and commercial property conveyancing and commercial law before teaching real estate and property law at the Australian National University on a casual basis. Since 2010 McRae has lectured in property law at the Australian National University, College of Law.

Honours
In 1990, McRae was awarded a Medal of the Order of Australia for service to migrant assistance.

See also
List of the first women holders of political offices in Oceania

References

Australian Labor Party members of the Australian Capital Territory Legislative Assembly
Australian public servants
Members of the Australian Capital Territory Legislative Assembly
1948 births
Living people
Recipients of the Medal of the Order of Australia
Academic staff of the Australian National University
Speakers of the Australian Capital Territory Legislative Assembly
Australian politicians of Italian descent
Women members of the Australian Capital Territory Legislative Assembly